The Mallinson Baronetcy, of Walthamstow in the County of Essex, is a title in the Baronetage of the United Kingdom. It was created on 6 July 1935 for William Mallinson. He was a Justice of the Peace for Essex. The second Baronet was a Deputy Lieutenant of Essex.

The title is currently held by Dr. James Mallinson, a scholar of Sanskrit and Yoga, who is a lecturer in Sanskrit and Classical Indian Studies at SOAS.

Mallinson baronets, of Walthamstow (1935)
Sir William Mallinson, 1st Baronet (1854–1936)
Sir William James Mallinson, 2nd Baronet (1879–1944)
Sir (William) Paul Mallinson, 3rd Baronet (1909–1989)
Sir William John Mallinson, 4th Baronet (1942–1995)
Sir (William) James Mallinson, 5th Baronet (born 1970)

References

Kidd, Charles, Williamson, David (editors). Debrett's Peerage and Baronetage (1990 edition). New York: St Martin's Press, 1990.

Mallinson